Percy is a 1969 comedy novel by the British writer Raymond Hitchcock. It recounts the story of a British man who has the world's first penis transplant, following an accident.

Hitchcock followed it with a 1972 sequel Percy's Progress.

Adaptation
In 1971 it was made into a British film of the same title directed by Ralph Thomas and starring Hywel Bennett, Denholm Elliott, Elke Sommer.

References

Bibliography
 Goble, Alan. The Complete Index to Literary Sources in Film. Walter de Gruyter, 1999.

1969 British novels
Novels by Raymond Hitchcock
Comedy novels
British novels adapted into films
Novels set in London
Ebury Publishing books